On December 15, 1981, the Iraqi Shi'a Islamist group al-Dawa carried out a suicide car bombing targeting the Iraqi embassy in Beirut, Lebanon. The explosion leveled the embassy and killed 61 people, including Iraq's ambassador to Lebanon, and injured at least 100 others.

The attack is considered by some to be the second modern suicide bombing, preceded by the 1927 Bath School bombings and presaged the 1983 United States embassy bombing and the 1983 Beirut barracks bombings.

Background
Emboldened by the success of the 1979 Iranian Revolution, the anti-Baathist Shi'a Islamist group al-Dawa, with financial and military assistance from the Islamic Republic of Iran, began to employ violence in its struggle against the Iraqi government. In 1979 and 1980, al-Dawa assassinated a number of "senior but low-profile" Baathist officials in Iraq. In response to a failed assassination attempt on Iraqi Deputy Prime Minister Tariq Aziz in April 1980 by al-Dawa, the Iraqi government launched a severe crackdown on the group, which included the execution of al-Dawa spiritual leader Mohammad Baqir al-Sadr.

The remaining al-Dawa leadership fled to Iran and the group became an "effective proxy" for the Iranian government against Iraq during the Iran–Iraq War, which broke out in September 1980.

Bombing
On December 15, 1981, a car filled with approximately 100 kilograms of explosives was driven into Iraq's embassy building in Beirut by a suicide bomber. The ensuing explosion devastated the embassy, killed 61 people, including the Iraq ambassador, Abdul Razzak Lafta, and injured more than 100 others. Balqis al-Rawi, the Iraqi wife of Syrian poet Nizar Qabbani, who worked for the embassy's cultural section, was also killed in the attack.

Impact
The attack, which presaged the 1983 United States embassy bombing and the 1983 Beirut barracks bombing, is considered by some to be the first modern suicide bombing, though others nominate earlier attacks.

References

1981 in international relations
1980s crimes in Beirut
1981 murders in Lebanon
20th-century mass murder in Lebanon
Attacks on buildings and structures in Beirut
Attacks on diplomatic missions in Lebanon
December 1981 crimes
December 1981 events in Asia
Improvised explosive device bombings in 1981
Embassy bombing in Beirut
Islamic Shia terrorism
Islamic terrorism in Lebanon
Islamic terrorist incidents in the 1980s
Mass murder in 1981
Mass murder in Beirut
Suicide bombings in Beirut
Suicide bombings in the 1980s
Suicide car and truck bombings in Lebanon
Terrorist incidents in Lebanon in 1981
Building bombings in Lebanon
Islamic Dawa Party
Bombing
Bombing
1981 disasters in Lebanon